Whisky Supper is the fifth album released by the Wicked Tinkers

Musicians
Aaron Shaw - Great Highland Bagpipe
Warren Patrick Casey - Tapan, Bodhran
Keith Jones - Snare, Djembe
Jay Atwood - Didgeridoo, Irish Horn

Special guest artists
Tyler Spencer
Bronze Age Irish Horn in 'Bb': made by Simon O'Dwyer, Galway, Ireland
Didgeridoo in 'Bb': made by Lewis Burns, Queensland, Australia
Slide Didgeridoo: made by Tyler Spencer, Eugene, Oregon
Shakers
Golden Bough
Margie Butler, vocal, whistle, bodhran
Paul Espinoza, vocals, mando cello & guitar
Kathy Sierra, violin

Credits
Produced by: Thistle Pricks Productions

Recorded on location at various venues across America.
 
Mixed by: Scott Fraser at Architecture, Los Angeles, CA. 
Captured on an Apple Powerbook G3 computer and a FireLite 30 GB hard drive with Digital Performer 3.01, and two "Mark of the Unicorn" (MOTU) 828s. All really great products.
 
A very special thanks, yet again, to Scott Fraser for his (creative input) ideas and support with the engineering for "On Location Recording". He has been a great resource in the new world of digital recording.
 
Mastered by: Brian Gardner, Bernie Grundman Mastering, Hollywood, CA.
Graphic Design & Production: Paul Manchester & Warren Casey 
Photography: Chris Keeney, San Diego, CA & Matt Mick

Copy Editing: Wendy Weisenberg & Aaron Shaw

Track listing 
Dream
Hey
Wicked Tinkers
6/8 Marches
Fiollaigean
Glasses of Wine
Birds
Toasty
Aaron's Set
Farmer
Terror Time & Ferret
Wicked Bough
Drummers Jigs
Flower of Scotland & Black Bear
Weird Jigs
Radar

2005 live albums
Wicked Tinkers albums